Maharashtra Electricity Regulatory Commission (MERC) (http://www.merc.gov.in) is a governing body to control certain regulatory and safety functions in Maharashtra based in Mumbai. It was incorporated under the Electricity Regulatory Commission Act, 1998, of Central Act in August 1999. In 2003, Under Section 82 of the Electricity Act the Commission is continued as regulatory body in state. It was established to promote competition, efficiency and economy in the power sector. It also regulate tariffs of power generation, transmission and distribution in Maharashtra.

See also
 Maharashtra State Electricity Distribution Company Limited
 Maharashtra State Electricity Transmission Company Limited
 Maharashtra State Power Generation Company Limited
 Brihanmumbai Electric Supply and Transport
 Maharashtra Energy Development Agency
 Tata Power

References

External links
TimesOfIndia | MERC effects 3.03% hike in power tariff
Business Standard | MIAL complains to MERC over R-Infra

Organisations based in Mumbai
Regulatory agencies of India
Government agencies established in 1999
State agencies of Maharashtra
Electric power in India
Electricity authorities
Energy in Maharashtra
1999 establishments in Maharashtra